Punjab State Highway 14, commonly referred to as SH 14, is a state highway in the state of Punjab in India. This state highway runs in Fazilka District from Abohar to Rajasthan Border in the state of Punjab. The total length of the highway is 21 kilometres.

Route description
The route of the highway is Abohar-Azimgarh-Wahabwala-Rajasthan Border.

Major junctions

  National Highway 62 in Abohar

See also
List of state highways in Punjab, India

References

State Highways in Punjab, India